HNoMS Harald Haarfagre, known locally as Panserskipet Harald Haarfagre, was a Norwegian coastal defence ship. She, her sister ship  and the slightly newer  were built as part of the general rearmament in the time leading up to the events in 1905. Harald Haarfagre remained an important vessel in the Royal Norwegian Navy until she was considered unfit for war in the mid-1930s.

Description
 Built at Elswick and nearly identical to her sister ship , Harald Haarfagre was named after Harald I of Norway, known as "Harald Fairhair" in English, the semi-mythical first king of a united Norway. Built as a typical pre-dreadnought battleship on a smaller scale, she carried guns of a wide range of calibers: two 8.2-inch guns in barbettes, six 4.7-inch, six 3-inch, and six smaller quick-firing guns. The ship could manage a speed of over seventeen knots. Protected by belt armor of seven inches thickness, the ship also featured gun barbettes with nearly eight inches of steel armor and an armored deck.

Service history and fate
A vital part of the Royal Norwegian Navy, Harald Haarfagre performed ordinary duties until she was considered "unfit for war" in the mid-1930s and disarmed. After the German invasion of Norway, she was seized by the Germans and rebuilt as a floating flak battery under the name Thetis. After the war Harald Haarfagre was used briefly as a floating barracks, and for transporting German POWs, before she was sold for scrapping in 1948.

Today the name KNM Harald Haarfagre is used on the Royal Norwegian Navy and Royal Norwegian Air Force Basic Training Establishment, located in Madla, Stavanger.

Footnotes

Tordenskjold-class coastal defence ships
Ships built on the River Tyne
1897 ships
World War II coastal defence ships of Norway
Naval ships of Norway captured by Germany during World War II
Auxiliary ships of the Kriegsmarine
World War II coastal defense ships of Germany